Ionuț Mihălăchioaie (born 31 January 1991) is a Romanian footballer, who plays as a right back.

External links
 
 

1991 births
Living people
Sportspeople from Bacău
Romanian footballers
FCM Bacău players
FC Politehnica Iași (2010) players
ACS Foresta Suceava players
CS Aerostar Bacău players
Liga I players
Liga II players
Association football defenders